3 Bahadur is a Pakistani film series comprising the 3D computer-animated films directed by Sharmeen Obaid-Chinoy. The series started with the film 3 Bahadur in 2015 and is followed by the sequel 3 Bahadur: The Revenge of Baba Balaam (2016).The third and final installment 3 Bahadur: Rise of the Warriors was released in 2018. Distributed by ARY Films, all films gather the story of three friends and their adventurous journey to save their community from evil.

Films

3 Bahadur (2015)

Directed by two times Oscar award winning director Sharmeen Obaid-Chinoy, the plot of the film focuses on three friends and their journey of saving the community from evils like Baba Balaam. The main roles were played by Zuhab Khan, Hanzala Shahid, Muneeba Yaseen, Behroze Sabzwari and Alyy Khan, as Saadi, Kamil, Amna, Dennu and Young Mangu respectively. The film was released on 22 May 2016 in Pakistan as the first full length computer-animated film of Pakistan. It also became highest grossing animated film in Pakistan.

3 Bahadur: The Revenge of Baba Balaam (2016)

After getting positive response on 3 Bahadur, director Sharmeen Obaid-Chinoy announced the sequel 3 Bahadur: The Revenge of Baba Balaam. She said "3 Bahadur was a very special project for me because it inculcated a sense of pride and ownership in Pakistani children. Now, with #3Bahadur Part 2, I want to make sure that Saadi, Kamil and Amna inspire bravery and fearlessness in every child across the country." The film will be released in December 2016 and it will be the debut of Fahad Mustafa, Ahmed Ali Butt, Ali Gul Pir and Sarwat Gilani as a voice over artist.

3 Bahadur: Rise of The Warriors (2018)

The third film, 3 Bahadur: Rise of the Warriors released in 14 December 2018, which has the voice by Mehwish Hayat, Fahad Mustafa, Sarwat Gillani, Nimra Bucha, and Behroze Sabzwari.

Cast and characters

Crew

Box office performance

See also

 List of Pakistani animated films
 List of highest-grossing Pakistani films
 Sharmeen Obaid-Chinoy filmography

References

External links
 Facebook
 Instagram

Film series introduced in 2015
Animated film series
Pakistani film series